Vaidava Parish is an administrative unit of Valmiera Municipality in the Vidzeme region of Latvia. Prior to the 2009 administrative reforms it was part of Valmiera District.

Towns, villages and settlements of Vaidava parish 
  – parish administrative center

References 

Parishes of Latvia
Valmiera Municipality
Vidzeme